Grandstand for General Staff (German: Der Feldherrnhügel) may refer to:

 Grandstand for General Staff (play), a work by Alexander Roda Roda
 Grandstand for General Staff (1926 film), an Austrian-German silent film directed by Erich Schönfelder
 Grandstand for General Staff (1932 film), a German film directed by Eugen Thiele
 Grandstand for General Staff (1953 film), an Austrian film directed by Ernst Marischka